Vāgbhaṭa (वाग्भट) is one of the most influential writers, Scientist, Doctor and advisor of ayurveda.  Several works are associated with his name as author, principally the Ashtāṅgasaṅgraha (अष्टाङ्गसंग्रह) and the Ashtāngahridayasaṃhitā (अष्टाङ्गहृदयसंहिता).  The best current research, however, argues in detail that these two works cannot be the product of a single author.  Indeed, the whole question of the relationship of these two works, and their authorship, is very difficult and still far from solution.  Both works make frequent reference to the earlier classical works, the Charaka Samhita and the Sushruta Samhita.  Vāgbhaṭa is said, in the closing verses of the Ashtānga sangraha to have been the son of Simhagupta and pupil of Avalokita.  His works mention worship of Cows and Brahmanas and various Vedic Gods, he also begins with a note on how Ayurveda evolved from Brahma.  His work contains syncretic elements.

A frequently quoted erroneous suggestion is that Vāgbhaṭa was an ethnic Kashmiri, based on a mistaken reading of the following note by the German Indologist Claus Vogel: "..judging by the fact that he expressly defines Andhra and Dravida as the names of two southern peoples or kingdoms and repeatedly mentions Kashmirian terms for particular plants, he is likely to have been a Northerner and a native of Kashmir...". Vogel is speaking here not of Vāgbhaṭa, but of the commentator Indu.

Vāgbhaṭa was a disciple of Charaka. Both of his books were originally written in Sanskrit with 7000 sutra. According to Vāgbhaṭa, 85% of diseases can be cured without a doctor; only 15% of diseases require a doctor.

Sushruta, "Father of Surgery" and "Father of Plastic Surgery", Charaka, a medical genius, and Vāgbhaṭa are considered to be "The Trinity" of Ayurvedic knowledge, with Vāgbhaṭa coming after the other two. According to some scholars, Vāgbhaṭa lived in Sindh around the sixth century. Not much is known about him personally, except that he was most likely to have been a vedic, as he makes a reference to Lord Shiva in his writings, and his sons, grandsons, and disciples were all vedic. It is also believed that he was taught Ayurvedic medicine by his father and a veda monk, named Avalokita.

Classics of Ayurveda

The Aṣṭāṅgahṛdayasaṃhitā (Ah, "Heart of Medicine") is written in poetic language. The Aṣṭāṅgasaṅgraha (As, "Compendium of Medicine") is a longer and less concise work, containing many parallel passages and extensive passages in prose.  The Ah is written in 7120 easily  understood Sanskrit verses that present a coherent account of Ayurvedic knowledge. Ashtanga in Sanskrit means ‘eight components’ and refers to the eight sections of Ayurveda:  internal medicine, surgery, gynaecology and paediatrics, rejuvenation therapy, aphrodisiac therapy, toxicology, and psychiatry or spiritual healing, and ENT (ear, nose and throat). There are sections on longevity, personal hygiene, the causes of illness, the influence of season and time on the human organism, types and classifications of medicine, the significance of the sense of taste, pregnancy and possible complications during birth, Prakriti, individual constitutions and various aids for establishing a prognosis. There is also detailed information on Five-actions therapies (Skt. pañcakarma) including therapeutically induced vomiting, the use of laxatives, enemas, complications that might occur during such therapies and the necessary medications. The Aṣṭāṅgahṛdayasaṃhitā is perhaps Ayurveda’s greatest classic, and copies of the work in manuscript libraries across India and the world outnumber any other medical work.  The Ah is the central work of authority for ayurvedic practitioners in Kerala.  The Aṣṭāṅgasaṅgraha, by contrast, is poorly represented in the manuscript record, with only a few, fragmentary manuscripts having survived to the twenty-first century.  Evidently it was not widely read in pre-modern times.  However, the As has come to new prominence since the twentieth century through being made part of the curriculum for ayurvedic college education in India.

Translations 
The Ah has been translated into many languages, including Tibetan, Arabic, Persian and several modern Indian and European languages. Selected passages of the Ah translated into English have been published in the Penguin Classics series.

Other attributed works 

Numerous other medical works are attributed to Vāgbhaṭa, but it is almost certain that none of them are by the author of the Ah.
    the Rasaratnasamuccaya, an iatrochemical work, is credited to Vāgbhaṭa, though this must be a much later author with the same name.
     an auto-commentary on the Ah, called Aṣṭāṅgahṛdayavaiḍūryakabhāṣya
 two more commentaries, called Aṣṭāṅgahṛdayadīpikā and 
 Hṛdayaṭippaṇa 
 the Aṣṭāṅganighaṇṭu
 the Aṣṭāṅgasāra 
 the Aṣṭāṅgāvatāra 
 a Bhāvaprakāśa
 the Dvādaśārthanirūpaṇa 
 A Kālajñāna 
 the Padhārthacandrikā 
 the Śāstradarpaṇa
 a Śataślokī
 a Vāgbhaṭa 
 the Vāgbhaṭīya 
 the Vāhaṭanighaṇṭu 
 a Vamanakalpa 
 A Vāhaṭa is credited with a Rasamūlikānighaṇṭu 
 A Vāhaḍa with a Sannipātanidānacikitsā

References

Literature
 Rajiv Dixit, Swadeshi Chikitsa (Part 1, 2, 3).
 Luise Hilgenberg, Willibald Kirfel: Vāgbhaṭa’s Aṣṭāṅgahṛdayasaṃhitā - ein altindisches Lehrbuch der Heilkunde. Leiden 1941 (aus dem Sanskrit ins Deutsche übertragen mit Einleitung, Anmerkungen und Indices)
 Claus Vogel: Vāgbhaṭa's Aṣṭāṅgahṛdayasaṃhitā: the First Five Chapters of its Tibetan Version Edited and Rendered into English along with the Original Sanskrit; Accompanied by Literary Introduction and a Running Commentary on the Tibetan Translating-technique (Wiesbaden: Deutsche Morgenländische Gesellschaft—Franz Steiner Gmbh, 1965).
 G. Jan Meulenbeld: A History of Indian Medical Literature (Groningen: E. Forsten, 1999–2002), IA parts 3, 4 and 5.
 Dominik Wujastyk: The Roots of Ayurveda. Penguin Books, 2003, 
 Dominik Wujastyk: "Ravigupta and Vāgbhaṭa". Bulletin of the School of Oriental and African Studies 48 (1985): 74-78.

External links
Scanned text of the Aṣṭāṅgahṛdayasaṃhitā, from the sixth edition edited by Kunte and Navare (Bombay: Nirṇayasāgara, 1939) Contains  2 Commentaries. At archive.org
Swadeshi chikitsa
Machine-readable edition of the Aṣṭāṅgahṛdayasaṃhitā

Ancient Indian physicians
Ayurvedacharyas
Sanskrit writers
Ancient Indian writers